Ralph Zachary Richard (born September 8, 1950) is an American singer-songwriter and poet. His music is a combination of Cajun and Zydeco musical styles.

Biography
Zachary Richard  began his musical career at the age of 8, as soprano in the Bishop's Boys Choir at Saint John's Cathedral in Lafayette, Louisiana. He attended Cathedral High School and Tulane University, graduating summa cum laude in 1972.

Richard has recorded Cajun and zydeco music for over 45 years.  He has recorded sixteen studio albums of which five were declared gold albums in Canada with a double platinum (Cap Enragé).  Although recording in both English and French, Richard's career has been notably Francophone. He has been awarded 5 Prix Félix (Quebec music award named after Félix Leclerc).  He is an Officer in the Ordre des Arts et Lettres de la République Française and a member of the Ordre des Francophones d'Amérique.  In 1980, he was awarded the Prix de la Jeune Chanson Française by the French Minister of Culture.

In addition to his musical works, Richard published works include three volumes of poetry and three children's books. Faire Récolte earned the Prix Champlain (Quebec) in 1998 and Feu received the Roland Gasparic Award (Bucharest, Romania) in 2002.

Richard has collaborated on several television documentary projects including Against the Tide, the Story of the Cajun people of Louisiana (producer and music director) which received the Best Historical Documentary prize in 2000 awarded by the National Educational Television Association.  The French version, Contre vents, contre marées received the Prix Historia the following year.  Zachary was narrator and musical director of Migrations, Vu du Large, Coeurs Batailleurs, and most recently Kouchibouguac, l'histoire de Jackie Vautour et des Expropriés.

In 2009, he was made an honorary Member of the Order of Canada "for his contributions as an author, composer, singer and poet, and for his important role in defending and promoting the French language and the "Cadian" and Acadian identity".

In August 2010, following the 2010 Haiti earthquake and the Deepwater Horizon oil spill,  Zachary Richard released an album titled Le grand gosier featuring a hip-hop version of "Le grand gosier" by singer-songwriter Rocky McKeon using the original chorus in Louisiana French and adding verses by Samian in French and Emrical in Haitian Creole.  The chorus was performed by Zachary Richard, Rocky McKeon and a slew of well-known Canadian francophone artists, notably Bobby Bazini, Daniel Lavoie, Marc Hervieux, Richard Séguin and Luc de Larochellière.  The album also includes a version of "Le grand gosier" with verses solely in Algonquin, and another version with verses solely in Haitian Creole.

Richard suffered a stroke on October 17, 2010, leading him to suspend work and appearances for the rest of that year. He has since resumed touring, recording, and writing on his blog.

Discography
 1972 - High Time (re-released 2000)
 1976 - Bayou des mystères
 1977 - Mardi Gras
 1978 - Migration
 1979 - Allons danser
 1980 - Live in Montreal
 1981 - Vent d'Été
 1984 - Zack Attack
 1987 - Looking Back (compilation 2LP)
 1988 - Zack's Bon Ton
 1989 - Mardi Gras Mambo
 1990 - Women in the Room
 1992 - Snake Bite Love
 1996 - Cap Enragé
 2000 - Coeur fidèle
 2000 - Silver Jubilee (compilation)
 2002 - Travailler c'est trop dur (double compilation)
 2007 - Lumière dans le noir
 2009 - Last Kiss
 2010 - Le Grand Gosier
 2012 - Le fou
 2013 - J'aime la vie
 2017 - Gombo

Published works
 1980 - Voyage de nuit (Les Intouchables, Montreal)
 1997 - Faire récolte (with audio CD, Perce Neige, Moncton)
 1999 - Conte Cajun, l'Histoire de Télésphore et 'Tit Edvard (Les Intouchables, Montreal)
 2001 - Feu (Les Intouchables, Montreal)
 2007 - Télésphore et 'Tit Edvard dans le Nord (Les Intouchables, Montreal)

Major distinctions
 1978 - Gold record for L'arbre est dans ses feuilles, RIAA Canada
 1978 - Gold Album for Migration, RIAA Canada
 1980 - Prix de la jeune chansons française, République Française
 1997 - Félix, l'ADISQ, Chanteur francophone le plus illustré au Québec
 1997 - Officier l'Ordre des Arts et Lettres de la Rébublique Française
 1998 - Membre l'Ordre des Francophones d'Amérique 
 1998 - Félix, l'ADISQ, Chanteur francophone le plus illustré au Québec
 1998 - Prix Litéraire Champlain,  Conseil de la vie française en Amérique
 1999 - Félix, l'ADISQ, Chanteur francophone le plus illustré au Québec
 2000 - MéritasAcadien, Fédération Acadienne du Québec
 2001 - Double Platinum album for Cap Enragé, RIAA Canada
 2001 - Félix, l'ADISQ, Chanteur francophone le plus illustré au Québec
 2002 - Prix Historia, L'institut d'Histoire de l'Amérique Française
 2005 - PhD Honoraire en Musique,  Honoris Causa, Université de Moncton, New Brunswick
 2007 - Félix, l'ADISQ, Chanteur francophone le plus illustré au Québec
 2007 - Chevalier, l'Ordre de la Pléiade
 2008 - Honorary PhD in Fine Arts, Honoris Cause, University of Louisiana at Lafayette
 2009 - PhD Honoraire en Littérature, Université Sainte-Anne, Nova Scotia
 2009 - Order of Canada
 2010 - Honorary member of Regroupement QuébecOiseaux

See also
History of Cajun Music
List of Notable People Related to Cajun Music

References

External links 
 Official website of Zachary Richard

Living people
Songwriters from Louisiana
Members of the Order of Canada
French-language singers of the United States
Musicians from Louisiana
Cajun musicians
1950 births
People from Scott, Louisiana
Tulane University alumni